Paltas is located to the south of Loja city and is one of the oldest cantons of province of the same name. It was named after the Paltas, a community who used to live over the new city now called Catacocha in Ecuador.

Shiriculapo it is a pick of the mountain which holds the capital, Catacocha.  A nice temperature but mostly foggy during night, even though down the valley of Casanga, Macandamine, Yamana, Playas y Naranjo has a temperature that goes over the normal at its capital.

References

Cantons of Loja Province